Transkarpatia is the fifth album by the Polish symphonic black metal band Darzamat which was released in 2005 and was recorded at Los Angered Recordings in Sweden. The album was produced by Andy LaRocque (King Diamond).

Track listing
 "Sanguinarius" (Intro) – 1:23
 "Vampiric Prose" – 3:26
 "Hallucinations" – 3:57
 "Inhumatus" (Intro) – 1:08
 "The Burning Times" – 4:43
 "Letter from Hell" – 3:30
 "Blackward" – 4:02
 "Recurring Yell" – 5:11
 "Araneum" (Intro) – 0:50
 "Labyrinth of Anxiety" – 3:56
 "Virus" – 5:27
 "The Old Form of Worship" – 2:52
 "Tempted by Rot" – 4:36
 "Tribute to..." – 5:18

Notes
  The songs Sanguinarius, Inhumatus and Araneum are instrumental tracks and contain no lyrics nor vocals.
  A video of the song The Burning Times was made and can be viewed online.

Personnel
 Agnieszka "Nera" Górecka – vocals
 Rafał "Flauros" Góral – vocals
 Krzysztof "Chris" Michalak – electric guitar
 Patryk "Spectre" Kumór – keyboard instruments
 Maciej "Darkside" Kowalski – drums
 Krzysztof "Bacchus" Kłosek – bass guitar

External links
 Encyclopaedia Metallum (retrieved 10-17-08)

References

Metal Mind Productions albums
2005 albums
Darzamat albums